The Australian heads of government include the prime minister of Australia, the premiers of the six states of Australia, and the chief ministers of the two self-governing territories of Australia.

Current heads of government

Historical heads of government
Parties

Notes

See also
Premier of New South Wales
List of premiers of New South Wales by time in office
Premier of Queensland
List of premiers of Queensland by time in office
Premier of South Australia
List of premiers of South Australia by time in office
Premier of Tasmania
List of premiers of Tasmania by time in office
Premier of Victoria
List of premiers of Victoria by time in office
Premier of Western Australia
List of premiers of Western Australia by time in office
Chief Minister of the Northern Territory
List of chief ministers of the Northern Territory by time in office
Chief Minister of the Australian Capital Territory
List of chief ministers of the Australian Capital Territory by time in office
Prime Minister of Australia
List of prime ministers of Australia by time in office

 
Australia, State Premiers